Winogradskyella exilis is a Gram-negative, chemoorganotrophic, alkalitolerant and mesophilic bacterium from the genus of Winogradskyella which has been isolated from the starfish Stellaster equestris.

References

Flavobacteria
Bacteria described in 2010